Third Ward Historic District is a national historic district located at Rochester in Monroe County, in the U.S. state of New York. The district consists of approximately 126 structures in a well known enclave of primarily Victorian homes. Located in the district are the separately listed Campbell-Whittlesey House and Hervey Ely House.

It was listed on the National Register of Historic Places in 1974.

References

Historic districts in Rochester, New York
Gothic Revival architecture in New York (state)
Historic districts on the National Register of Historic Places in New York (state)
National Register of Historic Places in Rochester, New York